Mulkharka is a village development committee in Okhaldhunga District in the Sagarmatha Zone of mid-eastern Nepal. At the time of the 1991 Nepal census it had a population of 3719 living in 596 individual households.

Etymology
The name of the village development committee, Mulkharka, comes from the two local words, 'mul' meaning main and 'kharka' meaning a pasture.

Description
This village development committee lies in the hills of Okhaldhunga District. It has a dense forest of many useful trees,  herbs and shrubs. The concept of community forest has been introduced for a decade. Wild animals and birds such as deer, tiger, porcupine, rabbit, and peacock. can be easily found in the forests. Tamang community has a majority population in the VDC while Magar community also has a small settlement.

Economy
Majority of the population depend on agriculture. Crops such as wheat, potato, paddy are grown. Most of the youths, specially the male ones, have been to foreign countries like Malaysia, the United Arab Emirates, Saudi Arabia, Oman , etc. for their employment. 
Few people are engaged in teaching, shop keeping, driving and as armies in the Indian Gurkha Rifles.

References

External links
UN map of the municipalities of Okhaldhunga District

Populated places in Okhaldhunga District